Mordellistena fletcheri is a beetle in the genus Mordellistena of the family Mordellidae. It was described in 1959 by Franciscolo.

References

fletcheri
Beetles described in 1959